Damion Albert Reeves (born 12 July 1971) is a former Australian cricketer. Born in Darwin, Northern Territory, he represented South Australia in fourteen first-class matches during 1992–93 and 1993–94 seasons of the Sheffield Shield.

See also
 List of South Australian representative cricketers

References

External links
 

1971 births
Living people
Australian cricketers
South Australia cricketers
Sportspeople from Darwin, Northern Territory
Cricketers from the Northern Territory